

Pakistan

Balakot is a town in Mansehra District in the Khyber Pakhtunkhwa province of Pakistan.
Balakot Tehsil is an administrative subdivision (tehsil) of Mansehra District in the Khyber-Pakhtunkhwa province of Pakistan.
Balakot, Swat is an administrative unit, known as Union council, of Swat District in the Khyber Pakhtunkhwa province of Pakistan.
Kot Bala, also known as Balakot, Makran, is an archaeological site located in Lasbela District, Balochistan, Pakistan, on Makran coast.

Nepal
Balakot, Nepal is a village development committee in Parbat District in the Dhawalagiri Zone of central Nepal.